Michał Zblewski (born February 18, 1980 in Tczew) is a Polish bobsledder who has competed since 2004. Competing in two Winter Olympics, he earned his best finish of 14th in the four-man event at Vancouver in 2010.

Zblewski also competed in the FIBT World Championships, earning his best finish of 20th in the four-man event both at Calgary in 2005 and at St. Moritz in 2007.

External links
 
 Michał Zblewski profile at Sports-Reference.com

1980 births
Living people
Polish male bobsledders
Bobsledders at the 2006 Winter Olympics
Bobsledders at the 2010 Winter Olympics
Olympic bobsledders of Poland
People from Tczew
Sportspeople from Pomeranian Voivodeship